The 2002 Southern Illinois Salukis football team represented Southern Illinois University as a member of the Gateway Football Conference during the 2002 NCAA Division I-AA football season. They were led by second-year head coach Jerry Kill and played their home games at McAndrew Stadium in Carbondale, Illinois. The Salukis finished the season with a 4–8 record overall and a 2–5 record in conference play.

The Salukis' home opener against  was the first game to use the lights at McAndrew Stadium since 1973. The stadium's lighting system, which had been damaged by renovations after the 1973 season, was repaired before the season by volunteer workers from the local branch of the International Brotherhood of Electrical Workers.

Schedule

References

Southern Illinois
Southern Illinois Salukis football seasons
Southern Illinois Salukis football